Edilberto C. de Jesus is the incumbent President of the Asian Institute of Management in Makati, Philippines. He was appointed Secretary of Education on 16 September 2002 by President Gloria Macapagal Arroyo. to replace Sec. Raul Roco, who earlier resigned the cabinet post.

Education
A.B., Ateneo de Manila University
M.Phil., Yale University
Ph.D., Yale University
Doctor of Humanities, Honoris Causa, Ateneo de Manila University
Doctor of Humanities, Honoris Causa, Xavier University
Doctor of Humanities, Honoris Causa, Far Eastern University

Previous positions
President, University of the Cordilleras, Baguio, 2008
Secretariat Director, Southeast Asian Ministers of Education Organization, 2005-2007
President, Far Eastern University, Manila, 1995-2002
Associate Dean and chairman, AIM Policy Forum, Asian Institute of Management, 1994-1995
Associate Dean, Enterprise Project Research, Asian Institute of Management, 1992-1993
Presidential Adviser on Rural Development, Office of the President, 1988-1992
Deputy Commissioner, Presidential Office of the Peace Commission, 1987-1992
Chair, Rural Development Management Program, Asian Institute of Management, 1986-1987
Faculty, Rural Development Management Program, Asian Institute of Management, 1980-1986

Select affiliations
Trustee, Ateneo de Manila University, 1991-2002
Director, Centro Escolar University, 2006-2008
Columnist, Manila Bulletin, 2006-2009
Director, Manila Hotel, 2004-2006
Chairman, Institute of Environmental Sciences for Social Change, 2000-2002
President, Philippine Association of Colleges and Universities, 2002
Trustee, Coordinating Council for Private Educational Associations, 1996-2002
Trustee, Council for Security Cooperation in the Asia-Pacific
Trustee, National Museum
Trustee, The International Center for Innovation, Transformation and Excellence in Governance (INCITEGov)
President, Board of Trustees, FEU Public Policy Foundation, Inc.

References

De Jesus, Edilberto
Secretaries of Education of the Philippines
Living people
Ateneo de Manila University alumni
Yale University alumni
Arroyo administration cabinet members
Asian Institute of Management people
Manila Bulletin people
Year of birth missing (living people)